Dixie Tighe (1905–1946) was an American war correspondent.

Biography 
Tighe's father had been a reporter, and she followed in his footsteps in 1925.

Prior to World War II, her assignments included covering the trial of Bruno Hauptman, the kidnapper of the Lindbergh baby, and "stunt reporting", including reporting on her scuba-diving and skydiving lessons.

Tighe worked for INS and New York Post during World War II.

Nancy Caldwell Sorel, author of a book on female war correspondents, described her as "famous for her blunt language and flamboyant lifestyle".

Female war correspondents were rare, and she was the first female correspondent to ride on bomber during a bombing mission.  Tighe and another female correspondent were denied permission to accompany paratroopers, on D-Day, being told the jolt of a parachute could "damage their 'delicate female apparatus', causing vaginal bleeding".

Secretary of War Robert P. Patterson honored war correspondents during an event in Washington, D.C. on November 23, 1946.  Tighe was one of correspondents he honored.

Tighe was struck by a severe headache at an event for correspondents in Tokyo on December 27, 1946.
She was taken to the hospital for examination, where she suffered a stroke.

President Harry Truman honored five living female journalists at an event on April 20, 1947, and gave a posthumous award honoring Tighe to her mother.

References

War correspondents of World War II
1905 births
1946 deaths